The Ascension of Christ Church is a Macedonian Orthodox church in the neighbourhood of Novo Selo, Štip. The church is registered as a Cultural Heritage site of North Macedonia.

The church is located on the left side of the river Otinja, in the eastern part of Novo Selo, 1 km from the center of Štip which is located to the east.

Features
It is a one-nave temple that is considered to have been built by Duke Dimitrija in 1369. The original frescoes of the church have not been preserved. According to the Greek inscription, it was repainted in 1601 by the painter Jovan in the style of the Linotopi School. This second fresco painting lasted from May 13 to July 6, 1601, and the founding inscription mentions Bishop Rufim, the priest Dojko and the founder Pavle Mutavdžija.

Gallery

See also
 Dormition of the Theotokos Church - the seat of Novo Selo Parish and a cultural heritage site
 Saint John the Baptist Church - a cultural heritage site
 Holy Trinity Church - the cemetery church and a cultural heritage site
 Novo Selo School - the building of the former school and the present seat of the Rectorate of the Goce Delčev University. It is also a cultural heritage site

References

External Links
 The official website of Breganica Diocese

Churches in North Macedonia
Cultural heritage of North Macedonia